The Modern Education School (MES) is a private international school in New Cairo, Cairo Governorate.

The Modern Education School, established in 1997, is a co-educational school that is divided into three educational systems (the National division, American division, and British division) which serves grades from pre-kindergarten through high school.

Awards:

 2022 Cognia School of Distinction for Excellence in Education
  of 389.5/400

Partners:

 Goethe Institut (German)
 Schulen Partner Der Zukunft (German)
 

Divisions:
 American Division: The American system greatly develops students’ interpersonal and academic skills.
 British Division: The British education prepares our students to be confident in working with ideas and information.
 National Division: The Egyptian National Education at MES provides a very strong academic foundation for students.

References

External links 

 

International schools in Greater Cairo
1997 establishments in Egypt
Educational institutions established in 1997
Schools in New Cairo